Cham Choqal-e Sofla (also Romanized as Cham Choqāl-e Soflá; also known as Cham Choghāl-e Soflá) is a village in Robat Rural District, in the Central District of Khorramabad County, Lorestan Province, Iran. At the 2006 census, its population was 160, in 32 families.

References 

Towns and villages in Khorramabad County